Elvira Ramilevna Khasyanova (: born 28 March 1981, Moscow, USSR) is a former synchronised swimmer from Russia and is the director of the Northern Europe and Russia Region for the Special Olympics.

Elvira was a member of the Russian teams that won gold medals in the team competition in 2004, 2008 and 2012 Olympics.  She also won World Championships in 2001, 2003, 2005, 2007 and 2011 along with European Championships in 2002, 2004, 2006 and 2010.

Khasyanova has been a member of the national team since 1999. She announced her retirement on 1 November 2012 and began working for the Special Olympics organisation on 1 January 2013.

References 

Living people
Russian synchronized swimmers
Olympic synchronized swimmers of Russia
Synchronized swimmers at the 2004 Summer Olympics
Synchronized swimmers at the 2008 Summer Olympics
Olympic gold medalists for Russia
1981 births
Swimmers from Moscow
Olympic medalists in synchronized swimming
Synchronized swimmers at the 2012 Summer Olympics
Medalists at the 2012 Summer Olympics
Medalists at the 2008 Summer Olympics
Medalists at the 2004 Summer Olympics
World Aquatics Championships medalists in synchronised swimming
Synchronized swimmers at the 2011 World Aquatics Championships
Synchronized swimmers at the 2007 World Aquatics Championships
Synchronized swimmers at the 2005 World Aquatics Championships
Synchronized swimmers at the 2003 World Aquatics Championships
Synchronized swimmers at the 2001 World Aquatics Championships